All Hallows Staining was a Church of England church located at the junction of Mark Lane and Dunster Court in the north-eastern corner of Langbourn ward in the City of London, England, close to Fenchurch Street railway station. All that remains of the church is the tower, built around AD 1320 as part of the second church on the site. Use of the grounds around the church is the subject of the Allhallows Staining Church Act 2010.

History
The first mention of the church was in the late 12th century.  It was named "Staining", which means stone,  to distinguish it from the other churches of All Hallows in the City of London, which were wooden.

The old church survived the Great Fire of London in 1666 but collapsed five years later in 1671.  It was thought its foundations had been weakened by too many burials in the churchyard close to the church walls.  The church was rebuilt in 1674.

The parishes of All Hallows Staining and nearby St Olave Hart Street were combined in 1870.  At that time All Hallows Staining was demolished, leaving only the tower. The proceeds from the demolition funded the construction of a new church in East End of London, All Hallows, Bow.

During the Second World War in 1941, St Olave Hart Street was badly damaged by bombs. Between 1948 and 1954, when the restored St Olave's was reopened, a prefabricated church stood on the site of All Hallows Staining.  This was known as St Olave Mark Lane.  The tower of All Hallows Staining was used as the chancel of the temporary church.

The tower is maintained by the Worshipful Company of Clothworkers, one of the livery companies of the City of London. In 1957 the Clothworkers' Company built a church hall for St Olave Hart Street on the site of All Hallows Staining. The old tower now stands at the back of a small courtyard next to the new hall; and the remains of the church were designated a Grade I listed building on 4 January 1950.

The remains of 'Lambe's Chapel Crypt', lies under the adjacent yard. It was moved from the site of Lambe's Chapel in Monkswell Street and rebuilt here in the mid–12th century. It was said to have formed part of the 'Hermitage of St James on the Wall'. These remains were designated Grade II at the same time as the main tower. William Lambe became a master of the Clothworkers.

Contemporary description
At the North Corner of this Street, on the same side, was sometime an Hermitage or Chappel of St. James, called In the Wall, near Cripplegate. It belonged to the Abbey and Covent of Garadon, as appeareth by a Record, the Seven and twentieth of Edward I. And also by a Record the 16 of Edward III. William de Lions was Hermit there; and the Abbot and Covent of Geredon found two Chaplains, Cestercian Monks of their House, in this Hermitage: one of them for Aymor de Valence, Earl of Pembrook; and Mary de Saint Paul, his Countess.Of these Monks, and of a Well pertaining to them, the Street took that Name, and is called Monks Well street. This Hermitage, with the Appurtenances, was in the Reign of Edward VI. purchased from the said King, by William Lambe, one of the Gentlemen of the King's Chappel, Citizen and Clothworker of London. He deceased in the Year 1577. and then gave it to the Clothworkers of London; with other Tenements, to the value of Fifty Pounds the Year; to the intent they shall hire a Minister to say Divine Service there." from Faringdon Ward within. [St. Nicolas.]

See also

List of churches and cathedrals of London

References

Churches in the City of London, of which only the tower remains
Grade I listed churches in the City of London
12th-century establishments in England